The San Francisco Dragons were a professional field lacrosse team based in San Francisco and San Jose, California. From 2006–2008, they played in Major League Lacrosse and they ceased operations before the 2009 season due to the economic situation in the United States.

Franchise history

The San Francisco Dragons were awarded an MLL franchise in July 2005.  The original owners were Michael Levitt, Chris Bulger, and Charley Biggs.  The inaugural season commenced on May 28, 2006, against the Denver Outlaws. They lost the game 15–11, but went on to beat the Outlaws two times later in the season. The Dragons spent their first 2 seasons in Kezar Stadium. The Dragons had a strong inaugural season led by league MVP and Offensive Player of the Year, Ryan Powell. They finished the season 7–5 and a playoff team. They lost in the semifinals to emerging rivals the Denver Outlaws, 23–14.

On April 4, 2007 the Dragons were acquired by a local Bay Area investment group from the Dragons' previous East Coast owner.

The 2007 season began on May 19, with a loss in Denver to the Denver Outlaws, 14–21. The 2007 Home Opener was played on June 2 to a loss against the Long Island Lizards, 12-14.

For the 2008 season it was announced the Dragons would be moving 50 miles south to San Jose, California to play at Spartan Stadium and kept their name.

Season-by-season

2006 San Francisco Dragons season
2007 San Francisco Dragons season
2008 San Francisco Dragons season

Coaches and others 
President – Henry "Hank" Molloy
Executive VP/General Manager – Doug Locker
VP/Sales - James Martin
Head coach – Tom Slate
Assistant coach – Ned Webster
Director of Game Ops – Gary Podesta
Ticket Sales Manager – Neil Hueston
Media Relations Manager – Mandy Marks

Defunct Major League Lacrosse teams
Lacrosse clubs established in 2006
Sports clubs disestablished in 2008
2006 establishments in California
2008 disestablishments in California
Lacrosse teams in California
Sports teams in San Francisco